Churn and burn refers to a tactic used by large anti-union businesses with high turnover in order to bust an already-existent union in a given workplace.  "Churning" refers to the management practice of filtering new workers based on their support of unionism.  In a large business with poorly paid, entry-level workers with a high rate of turnover, support for a union can be gradually reduced by making sure during the hiring process that only anti-union workers are hired.  Eventually, support drops low enough to "burn" the union through decertification.

References

See also

 Anti-union organizations in the United States
 History of union busting in the United States
 Wal-Mart

Trade unions
Labor relations